The Pan Island Expressway (Abbreviated as: PIE) is the oldest and longest expressway in Singapore. It is also Singapore's longest road.

Initially conceived by the Public Works Department in the 1960s as part of road expansions for handling rising traffic volumes, work on the PIE commenced in 1964. The first section, Jalan Toa Payoh, was completed by 1969. Construction of the other segments of the expressway were carried out in the 1970s. The initial expressway, from Jalan Boon Lay to the East Coast Parkway, was completed in June 1982. The PIE was then realigned and extended further westward to Tuas between 1991 and 1993. By the 1990s, the expressway was able to handle large amounts of traffic. The expressway and the interchanges along its route were expanded in the 1990s and 2000s to alleviate traffic congestion.

Route
The Pan Island Expressway measures  and is the longest expressway in Singapore. Beginning at a junction with the East Coast Parkway near Changi Airport, the expressway runs northwest to intersect the Tampines Expressway. It then curves southwest, passing through Tampines, Bedok and Geylang before intersecting the Kallang-Paya Lebar Expressway and curving northwest, before heading west and running along the southern edge of Toa Payoh. From Toa Payoh, the expressway runs along the northern edge of Bukit Timah, curving southwest to meet the Bukit Timah Expressway, before heading west once again at Clementi Avenue 6. The PIE then travels along the northern edges of Clementi, Jurong East and Jurong West before ending at a junction with the Ayer Rajah Expressway at Tuas Road.

History

Plans
The PIE was initially conceived by the Public Works Department as part of plans to expand Singapore's road network in the 1960s to cope with a predicted large rise in traffic volume over the next two decades. It was the result of a four-year planning study conducted in 1967 by the Singaporean government and foreign planning consultants. The study was funded by the United Nations Development Programme.

Intended to connect Singapore's satellite towns and industrial estates, it would act as the main connector between the parts of Singapore and would handle high traffic volumes.

Construction
Construction of the PIE started in 1964 and took place in four phases. During the construction of this section of the expressway, rocks had to be excavated near Adam Road. Also, Kampong Chantek Bahru, off of Bukit Timah Road, was cleared to make way for the expressway.

In January 1975, the section of the expressway between Jalan Eunos and Kallang Bahru was completed, and Jalan Kolam Bahru, between Kallang Bahru and Woodsville Circus, was improved to form a part of the expressway. The section between Adam Road and Jalan Anak Bukit was opened in October 1976 and construction of the eastern part of the PIE, between Jalan Eunos and Changi Airport, started in 1976.

Work was started in November 1977 to expand Whitley Road to six lanes, along with the construction of a grade-separated interchange to link it with the PIE. The section of the expressway between Adam Road and Whitley Road was completed by 1978 and was opened to traffic in 1979. Construction from Jalan Anak Bukit to Boon Lay Road was started in 1978. To connect this section to the rest of the PIE, a $15.2 million viaduct over Jalan Anak Bukit and Upper Bukit Timah Road was built.

On 10 January 1981, the  segment of the PIE between Jalan Eunos and the East Coast Parkway was officially opened by Teh Cheang Wan, the then Minister of National Development, having cost $50 million to construct. The section of the expressway between Upper Bukit Timah and Corporation Road was opened soon after on 31 January 1981 by Lee Yiok Seng, the Parliamentary Secretary of National Development at the time. With the completion of two flyovers across Aljunied Road and Paya Lebar Road in June 1982—three months ahead of schedule—the PIE was fully opened.

Impact and expansions
Upon its opening, the Pan Island Expressway had a positive impact on traffic flow in certain areas by alleviating traffic, as was reported by a preliminary Public Works Department study in October 1981. From 1983 to 1984, two lanes, one in each direction, were added to the  section of the expressway between Mount Pleasant Road and Jalan Boon Lay.

By the early 1990s, the expressway was handling considerable traffic but experienced traffic congestion during peak hours. To alleviate this, portions of the PIE, such as the Woodsville interchange and the intersection with the Central Expressway, were upgraded in May 1991 at a cost of $180 million. In addition, service roads were constructed along the expressway near Toa Payoh and at the Woodsville interchange.

Work began on an  extension of the expressway from Hong Kah Circle to Tuas in October 1991, with a northward realignment and extension of the expressway from Hong Kah Circle to Pioneer Road North. Intended to serve as a connection to the Jurong industrial estate and Jurong West, the extension cost $81.3 million and was opened in December 1993.

As the amount of traffic using the KJE and PIE to the Jurong industrial estate increased, the Land Transport Authority upgraded the stretch of the PIE between Tengah Flyover and Tuas Road to a four-lane dual carriageway from the previous three lanes. The work started in March 2004 and was finished in March 2006.

Plans to connect the PIE together with Bedok North Avenue 3 were planned since September 2005, with construction began in May 2006 and completed on 29 November 2008, which provides a direct connection from Bedok to the PIE, after complaints over many years.

Beginning in July 2011, the stretch of the PIE between Clementi Avenue 6 and Adam Road was widened; one lane was added to both sides of the expressway. As well, the Eng Neo, Chantek and Anak Bukit Flyovers were structurally expanded. The widened portions were progressively opened to traffic from July 2013.

List of exits

{| class="wikitable" 
|- 
! scope="col" | Exit
! scope="col" | Destinations
! scope="col" | Notes
|-
| 1
| Changi Airport, East Coast Parkway
| 
|- style="background: #ffdddd"
| 1
| Changi South Avenue 3
| Westbound entrance and exit only
|-
| 2
| Upper Changi Road North/East, Tampines Expressway (SLE), Changi Village and Pasir Ris Town
|
|- 
| 3A
| Tampines Street 31/Avenue 2 (eastbound) Simei Road (westbound)
| Signed as exit 3B eastbound
|- style="background: #ffdddd"
| 4B
| Tampines Avenue 5, Simei Avenue
| Signed as exits 4A (Simei Avenue) and 4B (Tampines Avenue 5) eastbound; no westbound exit to Simei Avenue
|-
| 6
| Bedok North Avenue 3
| 
|- style="background: #ffdddd"
| 8A
| Bedok North Road
| Westbound entrance and eastbound exit only
|- style="background: #ffdddd"
| 8B
| Bedok Reservoir Road
| Westbound entrance and eastbound exit only
|-
| 9
| Jalan Eunos, Eunos Link
| 
|-
| 11
| Paya Lebar Road
| 
|-
| 12
| Kallang–Paya Lebar ExpresswayKallang Bahru, Bendemeer Road (westbound) Kallang Way, Sims Way (eastbound)
| Signed as exit 13 eastbound
|- style="background: #ffdddd"
| 15A
| Central Expressway (City),
| Eastbound exit and westbound entry only
|-
| 15B
| Central Expressway (Seletar Expressway/Tampines Expressway), Upper Serangoon Road
| Signed as exit 15 eastbound; no eastbound exit to Upper Serangoon Road
|- style="background: #ffdddd"
| 16
| Lorong 6 Toa Payoh
| No westbound exit; Signed as exit 16A eastbound
|- style="background: #ffdddd"
| 17
| Balestier Road, Thomson Road, Upper Thomson Road, Toa Payoh
| Signed as exit 17D eastbound; eastbound access to Toa Payoh
|- style="background: #ffdddd"
| 18
| Onraet Road
| Eastbound entrance and exit only
|-
| 19
| Whitley Road, Stevens Road
| 
|-
| 20A
| Adam Road (westbound) Lornie Road, Lornie Highway (Braddell Road, Upper Thomson Road) (eastbound)
| 
|-
| 22
| Eng Neo Avenue 
|
|-
| 24
| Bukit Timah Expressway (Woodlands)
| 
|- style="background: #ffdddd"
| 26A
| Dunearn Road, Clementi Road
| Eastbound entrance and westbound exit only
|- style="background: #ffdddd"
| 26B
| Upper Bukit Timah Road
| Westbound entrance and eastbound exit only
|-
| 27
| Clementi Avenue 6, (Commonwealth Avenue West (Clementi New Town) and AYE), Toh Tuck Avenue, Bukit Batok East Avenue 3, Old Toh Tuck Road
| Signed as exit 28 eastbound
|-
| 30
| Toh Guan Road
| 
|-
| 31
| Jurong Town Hall Road, Bukit Batok Road, Jurong East
| 
|- style="background: #ffdddd"
| 32
| Jurong West Avenue 1, Jurong East Avenue 1
| Westbound entrance and exit only
|-
| 34
| Jurong West Avenue 2, Corporation Road
| 
|-
| 35
| Kranji Expressway (BKE)
| 
|-
| 36
| Jalan Bahar, Kranji
| 
|-
| 38
| Pioneer Road North
|
|-
| 40
| Upper Jurong Road
| 
|- style="background: #dff9f9"
| 41
| Jalan Ahmad Ibrahim, Ayer Rajah Expressway, Tuas Road
| Westbound terminus; expressway continues as Tuas Road

References

External links

 A list of PIE interchanges
 Review of the play "Pan Island Expressway"

Expressways in Singapore
Bedok
Bukit Batok
Bukit Timah
Central Water Catchment
Changi
Clementi
Geylang
Kallang
Jurong East
Jurong West
Novena, Singapore
Pioneer, Singapore
Tampines
Tengah
Toa Payoh
Western Water Catchment